Jorella Marie "Ella" de Jesus (born August 17, 1993) is a Filipino volleyball player.  She was a member of the Ateneo de Manila University's collegiate varsity team from 2011-2015, and also of the 2015 Philippines U23 national team. She played for PLDT Home Ultera Fast Hitters as a Libero for the 2015 season.

Personal life
De Jesus was born on August 17, 1993 in Manila, Philippines. She studied at the Ateneo de Manila University in college and finished with an AB Psychology degree.

Career
Ella was a former Best Spiker and Best Blocker on her high school years. After graduating high school, she studied at Ateneo de Manila University and was a varsity player of the Women's volleyball team alongside the "Fab five". After the Fab five's departure, she won her first and second championship in the UAAP (Season 76 & 77). 
De Jesus played with the Philippines U-23 national team in 2015. She also played for the PLDT Home Ultera Fast Hitters as a Libero during the 2015 Shakey's V-League reinforced conference.

Clubs
  PLDT Home Ultera Fast Hitters (2015)
  BaliPure Purest Water Defenders (2016)
  Perlas Spikers (2017 - 2019)
  Creamline Cool Smashers (2020 - Present)

Awards

Collegiate
 2011 Shakey's V-League Season 8: 1st Conference -  Champions, with Ateneo De Manila University Lady Eagles
 2011 Shakey's V-League Season 8: Open Conference -  Bronze medal, with Ateneo De Manila University Lady Eagles
 2012 UAAP Season 74 volleyball tournaments -  Silver medal, with Ateneo De Manila University Lady Eagles
 2012 Shakey's V-League Season 9: 1st Conference -  Champions, with Ateneo De Manila University Lady Eagles
 2013 UAAP Season 75 volleyball tournaments -  Silver medal, with Ateneo De Manila University Lady Eagles
 2014 UAAP Season 76 volleyball tournaments -  Champions, with Ateneo De Manila University Lady Eagles
 2014 ASEAN University Games -  Bronze medal, with Ateneo De Manila University Lady Eagles
 2015 UAAP Season 77 volleyball tournaments -  Champions, with Ateneo De Manila University Lady Eagles
 2015 Shakey's V-League Season 12: Collegiate Conference -  Silver medal, with Ateneo De Manila University Lady Eagles

Club Team 
 2015 Shakey's V-League 12th Season Reinforced Open Conference -  Champions, with PLDT Home Ultera Ultra Fast Hitters
 2016 Shakey's V-League 13th Season Open Conference -  Bronze medal, with BaliPure Purest Water Defenders
 2018 Premier Volleyball League Reinforced Conference -  Bronze medal, with Perlas Spikers
 2018 Premier Volleyball League Open Conference -  Bronze medal, with Perlas Spikers
 2019 Premier Volleyball League Open Conference -   Bronze medal, with Perlas Spikers
 2021 Premier Volleyball League Open Conference –  runner-Up, with Creamline Cool Smashers
 2022 Premier Volleyball League Open Conference –  Champion, with Creamline Cool Smashers
 2022 Premier Volleyball League Invitational Conference –  Champion, with Creamline Cool Smashers
 2022 Premier Volleyball League Reinforced Conference -  Bronze medal, with Creamline Cool Smashers

References

1993 births
Living people
Ateneo de Manila University alumni
Sportspeople from Manila
Volleyball players from Metro Manila
University Athletic Association of the Philippines volleyball players
Liberos
Outside hitters
Philippines women's international volleyball players
Filipino women's volleyball players